Viv Fisher (born 1952) is a British former BBC audio engineer and multivocalist who performed all parts of the brass band used in the title sequence of the BBC television series Blott on the Landscape (1985). In 1978, Fisher appeared on the BBC children's programme Blue Peter.

See also 
Beatboxing

References

External links 
Title sequence of Blott on the Landscape
Information on the 1978 single
IMDB mini biography

English electronic musicians
BBC people
1952 births
Living people
British audio engineers
Academics of Ravensbourne University London